Blow Up Your Video is the eleventh studio album by Australian hard rock band AC/DC. The album was re-released in 2003 as part of the AC/DC Remasters series.

Recording
Writing sessions for Blow Up Your Video took place in London's Nomis Studio in July 1987, with the band convening at Studio Miraval in Le Val in Provence in the south of France in August and September with Harry Vanda and George Young, the production team behind the band's early albums. This was also the final studio album to feature drummer Simon Wright.

In a 2008 Rolling Stone cover story, George Young admitted to David Fricke that the Blow Up Your Video session was when he realized his brother Malcolm, who had always been a heavy drinker, was in the grips of alcoholism: "I saw the signs. Malcolm had a problem. I said if he didn't get his act together, I was out of there. I don't recall it having any effect."

The band recorded 16 tracks during the sessions, including the unreleased songs "Let It Loose" and "Alright Tonight", as well as other versions of "Heatseeker", and "That's the Way I Wanna Rock 'n' Roll". Two additional songs, "Snake Eye" and "Borrowed Time", were recorded but not featured on the album. The song "Down on the Borderline" was recorded, but not released until 1990 as a B-side. All three of these songs were later included on Backtracks in 2009. Demo tracks for the songs "Let it Loose" and "Alright Tonight" were stolen and bootlegged, so they were omitted from the final album cut.

Blow Up Your Video is the last album to feature Brian Johnson as a lyricist/songwriter (all songs on subsequent albums were written by the Young brothers).

The title of the album was taken from a line in the song "That's The Way I Wanna Rock 'n' Roll". In 1988 Angus Young explained the title to MTV Australia: "We were probably a band that's best seen in a live situation and that's how the title came about... 'Cause everything's automatic these days. A kid can flick on the button on a TV, he's got a remote control and he can zoom through everything and get it coming in from all over the world. You can turn on your radio and get rock coming in from America. For us, the best thing as a band it was always we were great onstage."

Tour

The band began a world tour in Perth on 1 February, playing 16 dates in Australia for the first time in seven years. The band played live four tracks from Blow Up Your Video on the tour: "Heatseeker", "That's the Way I Wanna Rock 'n' Roll", "Nick of Time" and "Go Zone".

On the eve of the North American leg of the tour (a long stretch that would run from May to November), Malcolm Young decided not to participate in order to deal with a by-now problematic alcohol addiction. Unlike Angus, who had always been a teetotaller, Malcolm enjoyed drinking but in recent years it had escalated to the point where it began to affect performances. The band's former US agent Doug Thaler recalls seeing the band at one of the Monsters of Rock shows in 1984: "I'd gone into AC/DC's dressing room and had a scotch with Malcolm and Jonno [Brian Johnson] while Mötley Crüe played. When AC/DC went out to take the stage, Malcolm had clearly had too much to drink. And they were playing the song that Angus used to do his guitar solo and strip to, and Malcolm would just barely keep a steady rhythm—he couldn't even do that. And he fell into the drum kit, and I thought, 'Oh boy, this is not headed any place good.'"

By April 1988, Malcolm recognised he had a problem and, ever mindful of his former bandmate Bon Scott's premature passing (the previous AC/DC singer died of alcohol poisoning in London in 1980), he began attending AA meetings, confessing to VH1's Behind the Music in 2000, "My drinking overtook my whole thing. I felt like Dr. Jekyll and Mr. Hyde. I had a talk with Angus... I was letting people down... I wasn't brain-dead, but I was just physically and mentally screwed by the alcohol." Filling in for him was Malcolm and Angus' nephew, Stevie Young, although Malcolm was present on the rest of the tour and in the Blow Up Your Video promotional videos. Stevie would also step in for Malcolm in 2014 when it was disclosed that the guitarist was suffering from dementia.

After their last few albums underperformed commercially, this tour brought AC/DC back into the spotlight and their following album, The Razors Edge, proved to be a greater commercial success.

Reception

The album was the band's biggest-selling album of new material since For Those About to Rock We Salute You, being certified Platinum in the US. Blow Up Your Video reached No. 2 in the UK and No. 12 in the US. The album was nominated for the Grammy Award for Best Hard Rock/Metal Performance Vocal or Instrumental in 1989. In the original Rolling Stone review, Jim Farber wrote, "Fortunately, the Young brothers continue to come up with enough inspired riffs to make the tunnel vision justifiable. In fact, the riffs here add up to the band's catchiest work since its classic album Back in Black." Greg Prato of AllMusic called the album "unfocused" and "glutted with such throwaways as "Nick of Time"." Canadian journalist Martin Popoff found the album "frustrating" and the band "looking too deeply for a new enigmatic direction".
Author Paul Stenning however described the album as, "the sound of a group remaining current but still defining the rock art form on their own terms."

Track listing

The additional songs "Snake Eye" and "Borrowed Time" were recorded but only released on the 12-inch single versions of "Heatseeker" and "That's the Way I Wanna Rock 'n' Roll", respectively. "Snake Eye" was also included on the 3-inch CD-single for "Heatseeker". The song "Down on the Borderline" was recorded, but not released until 1990, as the B-side of the Australian "Moneytalks" single in 7-inch, 12-inch and CD-single formats. All three of these songs were later released in 2009 on the Backtracks box set.

Personnel
AC/DC
Brian Johnson – lead vocals
Angus Young – lead guitar
Malcolm Young – rhythm guitar, backing vocals
Cliff Williams – bass guitar, backing vocals
Simon Wright – drums, percussion

Production
Harry Vanda, George Young – producers
Tom Swift – engineer
Jean-Jacques Lemoine, Chuck Cavanagh – assistant engineers
Roy Cicala – special assistance
George Marino – mastering at Sterling Sound, New York
Gered Mankowitz, George Bodnar – photography

Charts

Certifications

References

External links
Lyrics on AC/DC's official website

1988 albums
AC/DC albums
Atlantic Records albums
Albums produced by George Young (rock musician)
Albums produced by Harry Vanda
Albums recorded at Studio Miraval
Albert Productions albums